Thới Bình is a township (thị trấn) and capital town of Thới Bình District, Cà Mau Province, in Vietnam.

Populated places in Cà Mau province
Communes of Cà Mau province
District capitals in Vietnam
Townships in Vietnam